Edge of Normal is an American sci-fi web series created by Amanda Overton as her graduate thesis project from University of Southern California (USC). Inspired by Amanda's love for popular comics and films such as X-Men and The Dark Knight, Edge of Normal is a unique mixture of sci-fi and superhero elements in a web serialized format.
In 2013 the web series was bought for distribution by Wonderly. Wonderly is a YouTube Multi-Channel Network, subsidiary of Big Frame that focuses on innovative female creators.
Edge of Normal premiered its first season on July 16, 2013, with the episode "Natalie".

Plot overview 

The web series focuses on six teenage girls who possess extraordinary, mysterious and dangerous powers, and their struggle to grow up in a world where their mistakes have deadly repercussions. The first season comprises six episodes, one for each of the girls, and tells the story of how they must band together to save one of their own from her super-powered father. As of 2014 there has been no update yet as to whether or not there is going to be a season 2

Characters 

 Devin Brooke as Natalie Reed: 17 years old. A mind-reader that can both hear other people's thoughts and, through eye-contact, see and feel their memories. Lives with her maternal grandmother. Other relatives include a mother, step-father and twin brother that currently reside out-of-state.
 Anna Rubley as Gretchen Summers: 18 years old. Electronic symbiant and photographic memory. She lives with her mother, Francine Summers. They were abandoned by her father who has history of violent tendencies.
 Nik Isbelle as Kris Freeman: 17 years old. Her abilities allow her to generate an energy pulse rendering those nearby unconscious. She lives with her mother, Bonnie Freeman, and her sister, Kimmi. Both protective and impulsive. Kris acts as the primary care-giver for her young sister.
 Allie Shea as Kimmi Freeman: 12 years old. Her abilities allow her to project her consciousness forward in time allowing her to perceive future events. She lives with her mother, Bonnie Freeman, and her sister Kris. Despite her mother's physical presence, Kris is her primary caregiver.
 Katie Orr as Riley Marks:18 years old. Her physical appearance changes based on observers’ perception. Always wearing headphones, Riley considers her ability more of a burden than a benefit.
 Sarah Colbert as Evey Simms: 15 years old. Her abilities are unknown until episode 6, when she reveals that people who hear her verbal commands must involuntarily follow them. Due to a traumatic incident with her power as a young girl, Evey doesn't talk and has been separated from her mother and homeless for over three years.

Episodes

Season 1 (2013)

Reception 

Edge of Normal has favorable reviews in Video Ink, AfterEllen, Snobby Robot, Autostraddle, Paper Droids and Indie Intertube (podcast). It was ranked among the top 3 Indie web series of the week, feature as one of the best videos from all over my internet by Autostraddle, and reviewed by Spanish blog Lesbicanarias as a diamond in the rough. The web series have also been feature in Vox Magazine as a YouTube web series to watch, SgImpact, The PNT TV network and wiwmonline.com

References

External links 

 
 
 

2013 web series debuts

American science fiction web series
American drama web series
2010s YouTube series
Superhero science fiction web series